Charles "Charlie" Thornton Finn (July 28, 1899 – January 13, 1974) was an American water polo player who competed in the 1932 Summer Olympics and in the 1936 Summer Olympics.

In 1932, he was part of the American team which won the bronze medal. He played all four matches.

Four years later, at the 1936 Summer Olympics, he was a member of the American team which was eliminated in the first round of the 1936 tournament. He played all three matches.

In 1983, he was inducted into the USA Water Polo Hall of Fame.

See also
 List of Olympic medalists in water polo (men)

References

External links
 

1899 births
1974 deaths
American male water polo players
Olympic bronze medalists for the United States in water polo
Water polo players at the 1932 Summer Olympics
Water polo players at the 1936 Summer Olympics
Medalists at the 1932 Summer Olympics